This list contains notable publishing organizations (past and present) and imprints that specialize in pornographic books.
 Black Lace, an erotic imprint with solely female authors.
Circlet Press, a publisher of science fiction and fantasy erotica.
Cleis Press, a publisher of erotica with a focus on, Women's, LGBT, and BDSM erotica. 
Ellora's Cave, an erotic fiction publisher.
Erotika Biblion Society was an erotic publisher from 1888 to 1909 based in London.
Greenery Press, a publisher specializing in non-fiction books on sexuality.
Greenleaf Classics, a large publisher of erotic fiction, primarily in the 1950s and 1960s, located in San Diego, California.
Grove Press, an American alternative books publisher established in 1951.
 Nexus Books, an erotic imprint focusing on BDSM.
Olympia Press, a Paris-based publisher launched in 1953 that no longer publishes
Smut Peddler Presents, an erotic imprint specializing in queer and female-centric graphic novels.

See also
 Erotic literature

References

Pornography-related lists
Erotic fiction